Superficial granulomatous pyoderma is a cutaneous condition, a variant of pyoderma gangrenosum characterized by a localized superficial vegetative or ulcerative lesion, which usually follows trauma, such as surgery.

See also 
 PAPA syndrome
 List of cutaneous conditions

References 

Reactive neutrophilic cutaneous conditions